Jungle boots are a type of combat boot designed for use in jungle warfare or in hot, wet, and humid environments where a standard leather combat boot would be uncomfortable or unsuitable to wear. Jungle boots have vent holes in the instep and sometimes a canvas upper to aid in ventilation and drainage of moisture.

Development and use
The use of "jungle" or "hot weather" boots predates World War II, when small units of U.S. soldiers in Panama were issued rubber-soled, canvas-upper boots for testing.  Developed in conjunction with the U.S. Rubber Company, a pair of jungle boots weighed approximately three pounds.  Adopted in 1942, the design of the jungle boot was based on the idea that no boot could possibly keep out water and still provide sufficient ventilation to the feet in a jungle or swamp environment.  Instead, the jungle boot was designed to permit water and perspiration to drain, drying the feet while preventing the entry of insects, mud, or sand.

In 1942, fused layers of original-specification Saran or PVDC were used to make woven mesh ventilating insoles for newly developed jungle boots made of rubber and canvas.  The Saran ventilating insoles trapped air which was circulated throughout the interior of the boot during the act of walking; moist interior air was exchanged for outside air via the boot's water drain eyelets.  In cold weather, the trapped air in Saran insoles kept feet from freezing by insulating them from the frozen ground; when walking, the insoles circulated moist air that would otherwise condense and freeze, causing trench foot or frostbite.

The new M-1942 canvas-and-rubber jungle boots with Saran mesh insoles were tested by experimental Army units in jungle exercises in Panama, Venezuela, and other countries, where they were found to increase the flow of dry outside air to the insole and base of the foot, reducing blisters and tropical ulcers.  The Saran ventilating mesh insole was also used in the M-1945 tropical combat boot.

World War II
Positive reports from users in the Panama Experimental Platoon on the new lightweight footwear led to M-1942 jungle boots used by U.S. military personnel in tropical/jungle environments, including U.S. Army personnel in New Guinea and the Philippines, and in Burma with Merrill's Marauders, the 1st Air Commando Group and the Mars Task Force (5332nd Brigade, Provisional).  This style footwear wore faster than the standard Army Type II field shoes, so they were often carried as a back-up footwear for use in soft mud.

In 1944, the Panama sole developed by Raymond Dobie uses angled lugs to push soft mud from the soles, clearing them to provide better grip in greasy clay or mud.  However, M-1942 (Jungle) and M-1945 (Combat Boot, Tropical) boots used Vibram soles.  After the conclusion of World War II, American interest in jungle equipment lay dormant until their next tropical engagement in 1965, so an 'improved' jungle boot used Dobie's Panama sole.

Although taller, British military forces used a variant of the American jungle boot. Special Operations Executive Force 136 personnel were issued these boots during operations in Burma 1944–45, then were used in the Malayan Emergency.

The First Indochina War
The French rubber/canvas jungle boots were manufactured by Palladium during the First Indochina War. Variants were available during the Algerian War.

Vietnam War 
In the early years of the American involvement in the Vietnam War, some U.S. Army soldiers were issued+ the 'M-1945 Tropical Combat Boot'. In 1965, newly-developed footwear was developed using developments since the end of World War. The second version was adopted by the U.S. military as the 'M-1966 Jungle Boot', jointly co-developed by the Natick Laboratories in joint co-development with the shoe industry. In the newly-developed 'improved' footwear, the upper was cotton, leather comprised the toe and heel, with improved nylon reinforcements around the throat.  That 'improved' footwear used a Vibram-type lugged sole co-joined to the leather toe and heel.  Water drains in the form of screened eyelets in the canvas top near the bottom were intended to drain moist mud from the inside of the boot using a hastily-modified version of the Bernoulli Principle.  To use up old stock, the 1942 version of the removable ventilating insoles of fused layers of Saran plastic screen were issued with the 'improved' jungle boot.U.S. Army contracts went to shoe manufacturers such as Genesco, Bata (in Belcamp MD), and Belleville Shoe MFG CO. to produce the M-1966 Jungle boot.

To help prevent American foot injuries from punji stake traps, the 1966 jungle boots used a stainless steel plate inside the boot's sole to protect the wearer from enemy punji stake traps and nails.  Later jungle boots used nylon/canvas uppers instead of cotton duck.  The footwear received 'improvements', including Dobie's mud-clearing outsole and nylon webbing reinforcement on the uppers.  Vibram-soled Jungle Boots continued to be issued to troops in 1969.

The US military jungle boot's popularity extended beyond Americans. Poorly-equipped Australian Army and New Zealand Army soldiers traded for a pair of jungle boots from American troops to use alongside their standard-issue black leather General Purpose Boots (GP Boots). After the 1st Battalion of the Royal Australian Regiment (1 RAR) co-joined the Americans in The Republic Of South Vietnam alongside the US Army's 173rd Airborne Brigade in 1965, many Australian troopers were willingly traded their worthless Army-issue "slouch hats" for a pair of jungle boots from the Americans since the boots Australian troopers were issued were World War II vintage tropical-studded ankle boots and their footwear were poorly suited to the conditions in the country. Australian and New Zealand Special Air Service troopers used American jungle boots during their involvement against the Vietnamese, and they were very popular with SAS troopers. Until the replacement of the GP Boots for the Terra Boots in 2000, Australians wore American footwear with their uniforms; the boots remained popular with Australian soldiers post-Vietnam.

Post-Vietnam jungle boot designs

The Vietnam-era jungle boots were quite successful. They went through minor 'improvements' since 1962 and used in large numbers by troops in the Republic. Jungle boots were the standard combat footwear for mild weather for decades following Vietnam. The last nomenclature for jungle boots was 'Boot, Hot Weather, Type I, Black, Hot-Wet', and uses either OG107 green or black for the nylon sections of the upper. In addition, the 'Mod 2' boot is identical except with tan color for the leather and the nylon, eliminating  the protective steel plate because of its reliability as a conductor of heat in hot sand and  vent eyelets because they allow sand in. The US military jungle boot helped influence the design of the notorious Desert Combat Footwear of the Americans' next series of wars, Operation Desert Storm in 1991, Operation Enduring Freedom in Afghanistan in 2001, and Operation Iraqi Freedom in 2003. Despite the introduction of the desert boot by the time of Operation Desert Storm, supplies were limited and many troops wore jungle boots. Even during Operation Enduring Freedom over a decade later, many American troops used black jungle boots and black leather speed-lace combat footwear alongside the newer desert footwear in Afghanistan during the early 2000s.

During the 1980s, some 'improvements' incorporated over the years in American footwear were modified or discarded for cost and convenience to the contractors.  This included changes in rubber sole composition (reducing the janitorial load by reducing the tell-tale 'marking' of linoleum floors), and use of waterproof Poron linings instead of the left-overs from 1942 Saran ventilating in-soles.  The 'improved' version of the footwear retain their two-way water 'drain' eyelets, so water is sucked into the boot, soaking the open-cell Poron in-soles in constant contact with the bottom of the foot. British forces use Saran insoles in their footwear because they like its insulating properties.

Increasing use of the jungle boot as a general-purpose combat boot wrought further 'improvements'. To use up left-over stock, the issue boot's Dobie sole reverted to a Vibram sole in the 1980s.  However, the Vibram sole, while suitable for rocks, sand, or other hard terrain, lacked the mud-clearing qualities of Dobie's sole, and was inferior in jungles or swamps.  Other 'improvements' were made to lower the costs to tax-payers.  By the late 1980s, thousands of incidents of field destruction were reported by troopers, including heel blowouts and loss of water drains (screened eyelets) from poor materials/poor quality control.

Today, Altama Footwear and Wellco Footwear are two American manufacturers of American military jungle footwear. Altama began manufacturing boots for the military near the end of American involvement in Vietnam, in 1969, supplying the military with footwear. Wellco gained the first tax-payers contract for boots in 1965.  These companies manufacture footwear with waterproof insoles and Vibram or Dobie outsoles with green cotton/nylon uppers and conventional eyelets, and manufacture an 'improved' version with a black Cordura upper and a Speedlace-and-eyelet lacing 'system'. Atalaia manufactures jungle footwear for the Brazilian Army. McRae boots of North Carolina produces the original green cotton boot and the black nylon boot in the US.

In 2005, the United States Marine Corps retired the black jungle boots from front-line military service, and replaced them with two versions of a new tan rough-out leather combat boot. One version, called the Temperate or Infantry Combat Boot, has an inner waterproof Gore-Tex lining.  The Temperate boot is an effort to keep moisture out of the boot because, after the interior is wet, moisture tends to remain there.  The lining limits air exchange, limiting its use to environments with temperatures of 98 °F or less.  Another version, the Hot Weather Boot, eliminates the lining while retaining the vents. The US Army and US Air Force removed the black jungle boot from frontline service, swapping them for suede desert-style boots after the US Army adopted the Army Combat Uniform and the US Air Force adopted the Airman Battle Uniform. Some government agencies outside the United States issue US-made jungle boots to their troopers. One example is in Afghanistan. with soldiers of the Afghan National Army wearing black jungle boots with American-made combat uniforms.

See also
 United States Army Uniform in World War II

References

External links
 Arroyo boots
 Altama Footwear
 Wellco boots
 Magnum Military boots/Ascot International
 jungle boots 
 McRae Footwear

Military uniforms
Military boots